The Office of the Coordinator of Information was an intelligence and propaganda agency of the United States Government, founded on July 11, 1941, by President Franklin D. Roosevelt, prior to U.S. involvement in the Second World War.  It was intended to overcome the lack of coordination between existing agencies which, in part, it did by duplicating some of their functions.

Roosevelt was persuaded to create the office several months before the United States entered the war by prominent New York lawyer William J. Donovan, who had been dispatched to London by the president to assess the ability of the British to continue fighting after the French capitulation to German aggression, and by American playwright Robert Sherwood, who served as Roosevelt's primary speechwriter on foreign affairs.  British officials, including John Godfrey of the British Naval Intelligence Division and William Stephenson, head of British Security Co-ordination in New York, also encouraged Roosevelt to create the agency.

Donovan's primary interests were military intelligence and covert operations.  Sherwood handled the dissemination of domestic information and foreign propaganda.  He recruited the noted radio producer John Houseman, who because of his Romanian birth at the time was technically an enemy alien, to develop an overseas radio program for broadcast to the Axis powers and the populations of the territories they had conquered, which became known as the Voice of America.  The first broadcast, called in German Stimmen aus Amerika ("Voices from America") aired on Feb. 1, 1942, and included the pledge: "Today, and every day from now on, we will be with you from America to talk about the war. . . . The news may be good or bad for us -- We will always tell you the truth."

Donovan's desire to use propaganda for tactical military purposes and Sherwood's emphasis on what later became known as public diplomacy were a continuing source of conflict between the two men. On June 13, 1942, Roosevelt split the functions and created two new agencies: the Office of Strategic Services, a predecessor of the Central Intelligence Agency, and the Office of War Information, a predecessor of the United States Information Agency.

Notes

External links
COI Came First, from the website of the CIA

Defunct United States intelligence agencies